The Romani people in Canada are citizens of Canada who are of Romani descent. According to the 2011 Census there were 5,255 Canadians who claimed Romani  ancestry. They are sometimes referred as "Gypsies", but that is considered to be a racial slur.

History

Origin
The Romani people originate from the Northern India, presumably from the northwestern Indian states Rajasthan and Punjab.

The linguistic evidence has indisputably shown that roots of Romani language lie in India: the language has grammatical characteristics of Indian languages and shares with them a big part of the basic lexicon, for example, body parts or daily routines.

More exactly, Romani shares the basic lexicon with Hindi and Punjabi. It shares many phonetic features with Marwari, while its grammar is closest to Bengali.

Genetic findings in 2012 suggest the Romani originated in northwestern India and migrated as a group.
According to a genetic study in 2012, the ancestors of present scheduled tribes and scheduled caste populations of northern India, traditionally referred to collectively as the Ḍoma, are the likely ancestral populations of modern European Roma.

In February 2016, during the International Roma Conference, the Indian Minister of External Affairs stated that the people of the Roma community were children of India. The conference ended with a recommendation to the Government of India to recognize the Roma community spread across 30 countries as a part of the Indian diaspora.

Migration to Canada during the 1990s
When Romani refugees were allowed into Canada in 1997, a protest was staged by 25 people, including neo-Nazis, in front of the motel where the refugees were staying. The protesters held signs that said, for examples, "Honk if you hate Gypsies," "Canada is not a Trash Can," and "G.S.T. — Gypsies Suck Tax." (The last is a reference to Canada's Goods and Services Tax, also known as GST.)  The protesters were charged with promoting hatred, and the case, R. v. Krymowski, reached the Supreme Court of Canada in 2005.

Following the influx of over 3,000 Czech Romani refugees to Canada in 1997 a community center was opened in Toronto, Ontario. The Roma Community Centre is a non-profit organization  that is dedicated to providing community support to the Romani people in Canada. The organization was founded in 1997.  The centre has also provided assistance to Romani refugees from the former Yugoslavia (Serbia, Croatia,  North Macedonia, Montenegro, Bosnia, Slovenia, Kosovo), Czech Republic, Slovakia, Hungary, Romania, Albania, Ukraine, Poland, Portugal, Greece, Ireland, Bulgaria, and other countries with Roma populations. These refugees claim to be fleeing discrimination and persecution in Europe. The centre has also denounced pejorative statements about Romani people in the Canadian media and has denounced antisemitism and racism.

Recent
Starting in 2008, Roma immigration from Hungary began to increase. That year Hungary fell into recession, and violence and discrimination against Roma increased. Many Roma in Hungary live in squalor. In 2011 Roma asylum seekers from Hungary numbered 4,400, but most of these claims were either rejected or withdrawn. Immigration Minister Jason Kenney was quoted as saying in 2012 "If they subsequently withdraw their own claim, they’re telling us that in fact they don’t need Canada’s protection, that they’re not victims of persecution, and that’s… a bogus claim. It’s a fake claim."

The government has since pushed to reduce Hungarian Roma immigration. In December 2012, Hungary was added to a list of "Safe Countries", which would make refugee claims harder.

On September 5, 2012, prominent Canadian commentator Ezra Levant broadcast a commentary "The Jew vs. the Gypsies" on The Source in which he accused the Romani people of being a group of criminals saying:These are gypsies, a culture synonymous with swindlers. The phrase gypsy and cheater have been so interchangeable historically that the word has entered the English language as a verb: he gypped me. Well the gypsies have gypped us. Too many have come here as false refugees. And they come here to gyp us again and rob us blind as they have done in Europe for centuries … They’re gypsies. And one of the central characteristics of that culture is that their chief economy is theft and begging.

In March 2013, Levant apologized for his remarks, stating that "I attacked a particular group, and painted them all with the same brush. And to those I hurt, I'm sorry" and expressed hope that this "will serve as an example of what not to do when commenting on social issues." The Canadian Broadcast Standards Council (CBSC) subsequently ruled, in September 2013, that Levant's broadcast was “in violation of the Canadian Association of Broadcasters’ Code of Ethics and Equitable Portrayal Code,” and that his comments about the Roma were "abusive and unduly discriminatory against an ethnic group, and violated other provisions of the [code] regarding negative portrayal, stereotyping, stigmatization and degradation." The council noted that Levant had already issued two on-air apologies, and as such, he would not be ordered to issue another.

Prominent Romani Canadians
 Robi Botos - jazz musician
 Ronald Lee - writer

References

External links

Opre Roma: Gypsies in Canada, a 1999 National Film Board of Canada documentary

Ethnic groups in Canada
 
Canada